was a Japanese mathematician working on number theory who proved the Honda–Tate theorem classifying abelian varieties over finite fields.

References

20th-century Japanese mathematicians
Number theorists
1932 births
1975 deaths